Six ships of the Hellenic Navy have borne the name Chios (Χίος), named after the island of Chios:

  (1873–1880), a torpedo boat
  (1881–1912), a Yarrow-built torpedo boat
  (1914), a  ordered in Britain, entered service with the British Royal Navy as 
 Chios (1922–1923), a former German freighter, later converted into a repair ship as 
  (1943–1977), an LST1-class landing ship
  (1996–present), a 

Hellenic Navy ship names